The following is a list of state highways in the U.S. state of Louisiana designated in the 400-449 range.


Louisiana Highway 400

Louisiana Highway 400 (LA 400) runs  in an east–west direction from a local road northeast of Attakapas Landing to LA 1 north of Supreme, Assumption Parish.

From the west, LA 400 begins at the east end of a bridge across the Cancienne Canal.  It continues the path of a local road that begins at a junction with LA 401 just north of Attakapas Landing on Lake Verret.  LA 400 heads eastward and intersects LA 1011 and LA 1010 before ending at a junction with LA 1 opposite Bayou Lafourche.  LA 400 is an undivided two-lane highway for its entire length.

Louisiana Highway 401

Louisiana Highway 401 (LA 401) runs  in a southwest to northeast direction from a dead end at Lake Verret in Attakapas Landing to a junction with LA 1 in Napoleonville, Assumption Parish.  The route's mileposts increase from the eastern end contrary to common practice.

Louisiana Highway 402

Louisiana Highway 402 (LA 402) runs  in an east–west direction from a local road west of Brusle St. Vincent to LA 308 north of Napoleonville, Assumption Parish.  The route's mileposts increase from the eastern end contrary to common practice.

Louisiana Highway 403

Louisiana Highway 403 (LA 403) runs  in a north–south direction from LA 402 at Brusle St. Vincent to LA 308 at Paincourtville, Assumption Parish.

Louisiana Highway 404

Louisiana Highway 404 (LA 404) runs  in an east–west direction from LA 75 at Choctaw to LA 69 at Samstown, Iberville Parish.  The route's mileposts increase from the eastern end contrary to common practice.

Louisiana Highway 405

Louisiana Highway 405 (LA 405) runs  in a general north–south direction from LA 1 west of Donaldsonville, Ascension Parish to the junction of LA 1 and LA 75 in Plaquemine, Iberville Parish.

Louisiana Highway 406

Louisiana Highway 406 (LA 406) runs  in a north–south direction from LA 23 in Belle Chasse, Plaquemines Parish to the junction of two local roads in New Orleans, Orleans Parish.  It provides access to the Woodland Bridge across the Gulf Intracoastal Waterway for Belle Chasse and an area of New Orleans known as the Algiers Lower Coast.

LA 406 heads north from LA 23 (Belle Chasse Highway) in Belle Chasse.  Traveling along Woodland Highway, the route passes a series of newer residential subdivisions.  The roadway curves to the northeast, traversing a corner of Orleans Parish, and passes a small cluster of industrial facilities located alongside the Gulf Intracoastal Waterway. LA 406 proceeds straight ahead and crosses from Plaquemines Parish again into Orleans Parish, simultaneously re-entering the New Orleans city limits. After crossing underneath the Woodland Bridge, LA 406 engages in a roundabout with LA 407, which loops around onto the bridge and across the waterway.  The highway then passes the entrance to the upscale English Turn residential community and country club.  LA 406 curves due east onto Patterson Drive (also known as River Road) along the Mississippi River levee and proceeds to an intersection with Stanton Road.  River Road continues as a local road until reaching the U.S. Coast Guard station  later.

Louisiana Highway 407

Louisiana Highway 407 (LA 407) runs  in a north–south direction from LA 406 to LA 428 in New Orleans, Orleans Parish.  The route connects General de Gaulle Drive, a major thoroughfare through the Algiers area of the city, with LA 406 via the Woodland Bridge across the Gulf Intracoastal Waterway.

LA 407 begins at a roundabout junction with LA 406 (Woodland Highway) near the English Turn residential subdivision in the Lower Coast Algiers area of New Orleans.  The divided four-lane highway loops to the north and proceeds across the high-level Woodland Bridge over the Gulf Intracoastal Waterway, located along the Orleans–Plaquemines parish line.  Returning to grade, LA 407 intersects General de Gaulle Drive, which continues ahead through Algiers toward the Crescent City Connection bridge spanning the Mississippi River in Downtown New Orleans.  LA 407 turns north from this junction onto Woodland Drive and narrows to an undivided four-lane highway.  The route continues in this capacity through the residential Old Aurora neighborhood until reaching an intersection with LA 428 (General Meyer Avenue).

Louisiana Highway 408

Louisiana Highway 408 (LA 408) runs  in an east–west direction from a local road in Baton Rouge to a junction with the concurrent LA 37/LA 64 in Central, East Baton Rouge Parish.  The route connects northern Baton Rouge with Greenwell Springs, a rural community within the Central city limits.

LA 408 begins on Harding Boulevard at the west end of the Canadian National Railway/Kansas City Southern Railway overpass alongside the Southern University campus.  This terminus is located in an area within the Baton Rouge city limits known as Scotlandville.  LA 408 heads east across the overpass as a divided four-lane highway and intersects US 61 (Scenic Highway).  Several blocks later, the highway passes through an interchange with I-110 at exit 6, connecting to Downtown Baton Rouge and Natchez, Mississippi.  Jutting out from this junction is Veterans Memorial Boulevard, a local road that provides access to Baton Rouge Metropolitan Airport.  After passing along the south side of the airport, LA 408 crosses LA 67 (Plank Road), and the local name changes from Harding Boulevard to Hooper Road.   after exiting the Baton Rouge city limits, LA 408 crosses the Comite River into the suburban city of Central.  Over the next  are junctions with LA 410 (Blackwater Road), LA 946 (Joor Road), and LA 3034 (Sullivan Road).  During this stretch, LA 408 narrows to an undivided two-lane highway.  It continues northeast in this capacity until reaching a junction with LA 37/LA 64 (Greenwell Springs Road), which parallels the Amite River.

Louisiana Highway 409

Louisiana Highway 409 (LA 409) runs  in a north–south direction from LA 64 in Central, East Baton Rouge Parish to LA 959 at Blairstown, East Feliciana Parish.

LA 409 heads north on Liberty Road from a T-intersection with LA 64 in area within the Central city limits known as Indian Mound. North of Pride, LA 409 crosses from East Baton Rouge Parish into East Feliciana Parish and proceeds to a junction with LA 959 at Blairstown. LA 409 is an undivided two-lane highway for its entire length. As of 2018, the portion in East Baton Rouge Parish (except for the portion south of Bethel Church) is under agreement to be removed from the state highway system and transferred to local control.

Louisiana Highway 410

Louisiana Highway 410 (LA 410) runs  in a north–south direction along Blackwater Road from LA 408 to LA 64 in Central, East Baton Rouge Parish.

Louisiana Highway 411

Louisiana Highway 411 (LA 411) runs  in a north–south direction from LA 76 in Rosedale, Iberville Parish to the junction of US 190 and LA 78 in Livonia, Pointe Coupee Parish.  The route's mileposts increase from the northern end contrary to common practice.

LA 411 heads northwest from LA 76 in Rosedale alongside the east bank of Bayou Grosse Tete. Shortly afterward, the highway crosses from Iberville Parish into Pointe Coupee Parish. LA 411 continues along the bayou until reaching a junction with US 190 (Airline Highway) in Livonia, connecting with the cities of Baton Rouge and Opelousas. LA 78 continues the path of the roadway northward toward New Roads. LA 411 is an undivided two-lane highway for its entire length.

Louisiana Highway 412

Louisiana Highway 412 (LA 412) runs  in an east–west direction from LA 964 west of Slaughter to LA 67 east of Slaughter, East Feliciana Parish.

Louisiana Highway 413

Louisiana Highway 413 (LA 413) runs  in a north–south direction from LA 76 south of Erwinville, West Baton Rouge Parish to LA 1 Bus. in New Roads, Pointe Coupee Parish.

LA 413 heads north on Poydras Bayou Drive from LA 76 (Rosedale Road) in West Baton Rouge Parish.  It crosses the concurrent US 190/LA 1 (Airline Highway) in Erwinville.  The highway then skirts the Pointe Coupee Parish line for a short time before crossing it at a junction with LA 3091 (Flynn Road).  LA 413 makes a brief zigzag onto LA 416 in Lakeland.  Shortly afterward, the route turns west at an intersection with LA 414 (Island Road) and makes a long loop alongside the False River through Jarreau and Dupont to Ventress.  Here, LA 413 meets LA 414 (Ventress Road) a second time and turns north briefly to a junction with LA 415 (Patin Dyke Road) at Patin.  The highway turns west once again and enters the city of New Roads, where it terminates at a junction with LA 1 Bus. at the corner of Main and New Roads Streets.  LA 413 is an undivided two-lane highway for its entire length.

Louisiana Highway 414

Louisiana Highway 414 (LA 414) runs  in a general north–south direction from LA 413 north of Lakeland to a second junction with LA 413 at Ventress, Pointe Coupee Parish.  The route travels in a loop off of LA 413 around an area between the False River and Mississippi River known as "The Island".

LA 414 heads northeast from LA 413 through Chenal and across the Kansas City Southern Railway line to a junction with LA 415 (River Road) at the Mississippi River levee. LA 414 then turns west and proceeds back across the KCS rail line to its terminus at LA 414 in Ventress. It is an undivided two-lane highway for its entire length.

Louisiana Highway 415

Louisiana Highway 415 (LA 415) runs  in a north–south direction from I-10 west of Port Allen, West Baton Rouge Parish to LA 413 east of New Roads, Pointe Coupee Parish.  The route has a spur that travels , providing a connection to westbound US 190/LA 1 at Lobdell.

Louisiana Highway 416

Louisiana Highway 416 (LA 416) runs  in an east–west direction from LA 1 at Knapp to LA 415 at Hermitage, Pointe Coupee Parish.  The route's mileposts increase from the eastern end contrary to common practice.

LA 416 heads east from LA 1 through Lakeland, where it intersects LA 413.  The road curves northeast through Rougon and briefly overlaps LA 983.  At Glynn, LA 416 crosses the Kansas City Southern Railway (KCS) tracks at grade and intersects LA 982.  The route continues northeast to a junction with LA 415 in Hermitage at the west bank levee of the Mississippi River.  LA 416 is an undivided two-lane highway for its entire length.

Louisiana Highway 417

Louisiana Highway 417 (LA 417) runs  in a north–south direction from LA 10 at Red Cross to LA 418 at Legonier, Pointe Coupee Parish.  It exists in two sections, as part of the route between Red Cross and Coon is under local control.

Louisiana Highway 418

Louisiana Highway 418 (LA 418) runs  in a general north–south direction from LA 417 north of Quinton to LA 1 at Legonier, Pointe Coupee Parish.

The route heads northeast from LA 417 and crosses LA 1 in Innis.  It then turns northward alongside the west bank levee of the Mississippi River past Williamsport and the Angola Ferry landing.  At Torras, LA 418 curves westward and crosses LA 15 near the Old River Lock.  The highway continues along the Lower Old River and Atchafalaya River to a second junction with LA 1 in Legonier at the foot of a bridge connecting to Simmesport.  LA 418 is an undivided two-lane highway for its entire length.

Louisiana Highway 419

Louisiana Highway 419 (LA 419) runs  in an east–west direction from LA 417 at Quinton to the junction of two private roads east of Lacour, Pointe Coupee Parish.

Louisiana Highway 420

Louisiana Highway 420 (LA 420) runs  in an east–west direction from the concurrent LA 1/LA 10 east of Morganza to the junction of LA 10 and LA 10 Bus. north of New Roads, Pointe Coupee Parish.

LA 420 initially heads north from LA 1/LA 10 past Pointe Coupee Central High School then reaches the west bank of the Mississippi River and turns eastward.  Following the river levee to Pointe Coupee, the highway intersects LA 981.  It then turns south a short distance to intersect LA 10.  The road continues straight ahead into New Roads as LA 10 Bus.  LA 420 is an undivided two-lane highway for its entire length.

Louisiana Highway 421

Louisiana Highway 421 (LA 421) runs  in a southeast to northwest direction from LA 10 west of Jackson to US 61 north of St. Francisville, West Feliciana Parish.

Louisiana Highway 422

Louisiana Highway 422 (LA 422) runs  in an east–west direction from LA 19 in Norwood to LA 67 at Felps, East Feliciana Parish.

The route heads east on Oak Street from LA 19 (Main Street) in Norwood. After one block, LA 422 turns south onto Azalea Street and runs parallel to LA 19 for a short distance before resuming an eastward course for the remainder of its route. The highway travels through the northern central portion of the parish, just south of the Mississippi state line. LA 422 is an undivided two-lane highway for its entire length.

Louisiana Highway 423

Louisiana Highway 423 (LA 423) runs  in an east–west direction along Thomas Road from LA 19 to LA 67 between Baton Rouge and Baker in East Baton Rouge Parish. As of 2018, it is under agreement to be removed from the state highway system and transferred to local control.

Louisiana Highway 424

Louisiana Highway 424 (LA 424) runs  in a general east–west direction from LA 62 north of Pine to a second junction with LA 62 north of State Line, Washington Parish.

Louisiana Highway 425

Louisiana Highway 425 (LA 425) ran  in a north–south direction from LA 30 north of Gardere to LA 427 at Essen, East Baton Rouge Parish.

Louisiana Highway 426

Louisiana Highway 426 (LA 426) runs  in an east–west direction from LA 73 in Baton Rouge to US 190 between Baton Rouge and Denham Springs.  The route is located entirely within East Baton Rouge Parish and is known locally as Old Hammond Highway.

LA 426 heads east from LA 73 (Jefferson Highway) in Baton Rouge as an undivided four-lane highway.  It intersects LA 1068 (Drusilla Lane) just before crossing US 61 (Airline Highway), where the roadway widens to include a center turning lane.  Shortly before exiting the city limits, LA 426 narrows to two lanes at an intersection with Boulevard de Province.  The route proceeds eastward and intersects LA 3245 (O'Neal Lane) before terminating at US 190 (Florida Boulevard) just west of the Amite River.

LA 426 was the original traffic route between Baton Rouge and Denham Springs in the early 20th century.  Known as Benton's Ferry Road, it traveled from Jefferson Highway (formerly called Clay Cut Road) to Benton's Ferry on the Amite River near the present location of the US 190 crossing.  The ferry service was replaced in 1918 by a bridge (which was in turn replaced by an improved bridge crossing in 1933).  The highway was designated as part of State Route 7 in 1921, and it became part of the original alignment of US 190 in 1926.  Both designations were removed from the route in 1942 when an extension of Florida Boulevard from Downtown Baton Rouge to the Amite River was completed.  The road remained in the state highway system as State Route 7-D until becoming LA 426 in the 1955 Louisiana Highway renumbering.

As of 2018, LA 426 is under agreement to be removed from the state highway system and transferred to local control.

Louisiana Highway 427

Louisiana Highway 427 (LA 427) runs  in a northwest to southeast direction from LA 73 in Baton Rouge, East Baton Rouge Parish to a second junction with LA 73 at Hope Villa, Ascension Parish.  It is a busy suburban commercial and residential thoroughfare over most of its route and almost entirely parallels I-10.

LA 427 heads south from LA 73 (Government Street) along South Acadian Thruway as an undivided four-lane highway.  After passing through a diamond interchange with I-10 at exit 157B, the route turns southeast onto Perkins Road, gaining a center turning lane, and proceeds out of the Baton Rouge city limits.  Intersections with several major thoroughfares connect with the interstate to the northeast, including LA 3064 (Essen Lane), LA 1248 (Bluebonnet Boulevard), and LA 3246 (Siegen Lane).  The roadway narrows to two lanes after passing the latter junction and generally remains in that capacity for the remainder of the route. Just before it crosses into Ascension Parish, LA 427 briefly makes a jog onto LA 42 (Highland Road) through a second interchange with I-10 at Kleinpeter.  The route then curves to the northeast at LA 928 (Bluff Road) and crosses US 61 (Airline Highway).  Shortly afterward, LA 427 terminates at LA 73 (Old Jefferson Highway) south of Hope Villa, within the census-designated boundary of Prairieville. As of 2018, the portion of LA 427 in East Baton Rouge Parish is under agreement to be removed from the state highway system and transferred to local control.

Louisiana Highway 428

Louisiana Highway 428 (LA 428) runs  from LA 23 near Belle Chasse to LA 407 in New Orleans.  The route travels in an irregular direction and exists in two segments connected by local roads.  The portion that travels on General de Gaulle Drive, however, is bannered east–west.

LA 428 begins at a point on LA 23 (Belle Chasse Highway) between Belle Chasse and Gretna near the Jefferson–Plaquemines parish line.  It heads north on Behrman Highway, an undivided four-lane thoroughfare with a center turning lane.  The highway crosses from Jefferson Parish into an area of New Orleans (co-extensive with Orleans Parish) known as Algiers.  Just before the local name changes to Behrman Place, the center lane is replaced by a median, and the route proceeds to an intersection with General de Gaulle Drive.  LA 428 turns west onto General de Gaulle Drive, a divided six-lane thoroughfare with a wide right-of-way that includes a drainage canal.  The highway engages into a partial cloverleaf interchange with US 90 Bus. (Westbank Expressway).  Approaching this junction, the westbound carriageway widens to five lanes to accommodate traffic exiting onto the Crescent City Connection into Downtown New Orleans.

Passing through the interchange, the roadway narrows to a divided four-lane highway, and LA 428 soon crosses back into Jefferson Parish and enters the city of Gretna, where the local name changes to Burmaster Street.  LA 428 then turns north onto Franklin Avenue at the northern terminus of LA 23 and remains a divided four-lane highway.  The highway re-enters the city of New Orleans for a final time, and the local name changes to Nunez Street.  LA 428 crosses underneath the Crescent City Connection on US 90 Bus. and engages into a roundabout with Mardi Gras Boulevard, a local road, at grade level between the two bridge spans.  Shortly afterward, LA 428 turns to the northeast, and state maintenance ends at the five-point intersection of Lamarque, Vallette, Verret, and Hermosa Streets.  Local traffic may travel north on Vallette Street and east onto Newton Street, where state maintenance resumes at an intersection with Behrman Avenue.  Here, the roadway widens from two lanes to four lanes with a median and becomes known as General Meyer Avenue.  LA 428 proceeds eastward to a terminus at LA 407 (Woodland Drive).

As of 2019, a small portion in Jefferson Parish intersecting LA 23 is under agreement to be removed from the state highway system and transferred to local control.

Louisiana Highway 429

Louisiana Highway 429 (LA 429) runs  in an east–west direction from LA 73 west of Gonzales to LA 22 north of Sorrento, Ascension Parish.

Louisiana Highway 430

Louisiana Highway 430 (LA 430) runs  in a north–south direction from LA 25 in Franklinton to LA 438 at Hackley, Washington Parish.

Louisiana Highway 431

Louisiana Highway 432

Louisiana Highway 433

Louisiana Highway 434

Louisiana Highway 434 (LA 434) runs  in a north–south direction from a point south of US 190 in Lacombe to LA 36 between Abita Springs and Hickory, St. Tammany Parish.

It proceeds northward on Lake Road to a junction with US 190 and LA 1093-1. At this point, it turns northeast concurrent with US 190 across Bayou Lacombe. Shortly thereafter, LA 434 turns northward and eventually intersects I-12 at a diamond interchange at Exit 74. It continues northward through the community of St. Tammany to a terminus at LA 36.

LA 434 is an undivided two-lane highway for its entire length.

Louisiana Highway 435

Louisiana Highway 435 (LA 435) runs  in an east–west direction from LA 36/LA 59 in Abita Springs to LA 41 in Talisheek.  It is an undivided two-lane highway for its entire length.

The route has a spur that travels  to an alternate connection with LA 41, essentially forming a large Y-junction between LA 435 and LA 41.

Louisiana Highway 436

Louisiana Highway 437

Louisiana Highway 438

Louisiana Highway 439

Louisiana Highway 440

Louisiana Highway 440 (LA 440) runs  in an east–west direction from LA 441 north of Greensburg, St. Helena Parish to LA 10 west of Franklinton, Washington Parish.

The route heads east from LA 441 from a point just north of the Hutchinson Creek Wildlife Management Area and soon crosses from St. Helena Parish into Tangipahoa Parish.  It then passes through an interchange with I-55 south of Kentwood and intersects the parallel US 51 in Tangipahoa.  Just east of Tangipahoa, the roadway continues straight ahead as LA 1057 while LA 440 dips to the south onto a parallel alignment through Bolivar.  Just before crossing into Washington Parish, LA 440 curves to the northeast and rejoins LA 1057.  In Washington Parish, LA 440 heads slightly southeast to its terminus at LA 10 in Richardson, a point west of Franklinton.

Louisiana Highway 441

Louisiana Highway 441 (LA 441) runs  in a north–south direction from LA 42 west of Springfield to the Mississippi state line north of Easleyville.

Louisiana Highway 442

Louisiana Highway 442 (LA 442) runs  in an east–west direction from LA 63 north of Livingston to the junction of LA 40 and LA 443 north of Hammond.

The route heads east from LA 63 and intersects LA 1036 and LA 441, both of which it overlaps as it crosses various branches of the Tickfaw River.  Further east, LA 442 intersects LA 43 and crosses from Livingston Parish into Tangipahoa Parish.  Just west of Tickfaw, LA 442 passes through a diamond interchange with I-55 at exit 36.  In the center of town, LA 442 zigzags via US 51 and proceeds northeast out of the corporate limits.  After crossing the Tangipahoa River, the route curves due east to its terminus at a four-way junction with LA 40 and LA 443 south of Loranger.  LA 442 is an undivided two-lane highway for its entire length.

Louisiana Highway 443

Louisiana Highway 443 (LA 443) runs  in a north–south direction along Morris Road from US 190 in Hammond to a junction with LA 40 and LA 442 south of Loranger, Tangipahoa Parish.

The route heads northeast out of Hammond and has a brief concurrency with LA 1064 north of town.  After crossing the Tangipahoa River, LA 443 turns due north to its end at LA 40 and LA 442, connecting to Tickfaw, Independence, and Folsom.  LA 443 is an undivided two-lane highway for its entire length.

Louisiana Highway 444

Louisiana Highway 444 (LA 444) runs  in an east–west direction from LA 16 in French Settlement to LA 22 in Killian, Livingston Parish.

The route heads northeast out of French Settlement, intersecting LA 63 at Verdun, and parallels the route of LA 22 into Killian.  LA 444 is an undivided two-lane highway for its entire length.

Louisiana Highway 445

Louisiana Highway 447

Louisiana Highway 447 (LA 447) runs  in a north–south direction from LA 16 in Port Vincent to LA 63 north of Walker, Livingston Parish.

The route heads north from LA 16 in Port Vincent as an undivided two-lane highway.  Upon entering Walker, LA 447 passes through a diamond interchange with I-12 at Exit 15.  The highway widens to four lanes with a center turning lane and proceeds through downtown Walker, crossing both US 190 and LA 1027.  Reverting again to two lanes, LA 447 proceeds north through rural west-central Livingston Parish and intersects LA 1029, LA 1025, LA 1024, and LA 1019 before ending at LA 63 near the St. Helena Parish line.

Louisiana Highway 448

Louisiana Highway 448 (LA 448) runs  in a north–south direction from LA 37 north of Grangeville to LA 10 at Darlington, St. Helena Parish.

A rural route heading along the west side of St. Helena Parish, LA 444 parallels the Amite River at a distance, connecting LA 10 and LA 37, which intersect in Greensburg to the east.  It is an undivided two-lane highway for its entire length.

Louisiana Highway 449

Louisiana Highway 449 (LA 449) runs  in a north–south direction from US 190 in Walker, Livingston Parish to LA 37 southwest of Greensburg, St. Helena Parish.

LA 449 heads north from Walker and intersects LA 1024, followed by LA 63.  LA 449 turns west concurrent with LA 63 for a very short time before the former turns again to the north.  After crossing from Livingston Parish into St. Helena Parish, LA 449 enters the community of Pine Grove, where it intersects LA 16.  LA 449 makes a brief jog east onto LA 16 before proceeding north again at LA 1041.  LA 449 continues in a north-northeast direction to a terminus at LA 37 southeast of Greensburg.

LA 449 is an undivided two lane highway for its entire length.

References

External links
La DOTD State, District, and Parish Maps